Bats: Human Harvest is a 2007 Sci-Fi Channel original movie, directed by Jamie Dixon, and starring David Chokachi, Tomas Arana, Bill Cusack and Melissa De Sousa. It is a sequel to the 1999 theatrical film Bats.

Plot
A group of Delta Force soldiers, accompanied by  Russian born CIA agent Katya Zemanova (Pollyanna McIntosh), are sent to the Belzan forest in Chechnya in search of a rogue American weapons researcher, Dr. Benton Walsh.  As they search for Walsh's camp, they are attacked by genetically-altered carnivorous bats.  The survivors attempt to reach helicopter extraction but encounter various challenges, including Chechen rebels.

Most of the force was killed during the mission along with other groups of rebels, and only four members of Delta force, including Captain Russo manage to survive. Russo, the leader, finally discovers Walsh, who has become "immune" to the bats by injecting special chemicals into him. Russo kills the doctor and get back to the rebel camp, using a high-power microphone to send out noises to lure the bats back to the camp, where he ignites the fuel tanks and blasts the camp, killing all of the bats except one that survives at the end of the film, flying off a farmer's wagon. Russo, Downey, and Katya escape.

Cast
 David Chokachi as Captain Russo
 Michael Jace as Lieutenant Colonel Martinez
 Pollyanna McIntosh as Katya Simonova
 Marty Papazian as Downey
 Melissa De Sousa as Lieutenant O'Neal
 Tomas Arana as Dr. Benton Walsh
 Mike Straub as Candell
 Todd Jensen as Delta Force Colonel
 Ivo Simeonov as Major Sergei Kurkov
 Dimitar Karageorgiev as Russian Lieutenant
 Jamie Dixon as Hostage
 Bill Cusack as General Ramsey
 George Zlatarev as Grigor
 Vasil Draganov as Dmitri
 Vladimir Kolev as Colonel Vladimir Kurkov
 Bisser Marinov as Alu
 Hristo Petkov as Malik
 Hristo Mitzkov as Anatoli
 Velislav Pavlov as Chechen One
 Nickolai Lukanov as Russian Deputy
 Vlado Mihailov as Extraction Pilot
 Ivan Kotsev as Russian Pilot
 Filip Avramov as Russian General
 LaFern Cusack as The Secretary (uncredited)
 Lance Frank as Medic (uncredited)

See also 
 Vampire Bats

References

External links

2007 television films
2007 films
American natural horror films
Films shot in Bulgaria
Television sequel films
Direct-to-video sequel films
Films about bats
Syfy original films
American horror television films
Destination Films films
2000s English-language films
2000s American films